Rolleston is a parish and estate village near Billesdon in Leicestershire, England, and part of Harborough district. The population of the village is included in the civil parish of Skeffington.

External links

 Photographs around village
Parish Profile 2001
OS Map of Village
Article from Rolleston-on-Dove website

Villages in Leicestershire
Civil parishes in Harborough District